Three Rivers is an unincorporated community in Tulare County, California, United States. Located in the foothills of the Sierra Nevada at the edge of the San Joaquin Valley, the town is near the entrance to the national parks of Sequoia and Kings Canyon. The town's name comes from its location near the junction of the North, Middle, and South Forks of the Kaweah River.

The population was 2,182 at the 2010 census, down from 2,248 at the 2000 census. For statistical purposes, the United States Census Bureau has defined Three Rivers as a census-designated place (CDP). The census definition of the area may not precisely correspond to local understanding of the area with the same name.

The two national parks, which border the town to the northeast, are the prime attraction of Three Rivers.

Geography
Three Rivers is located in the Kaweah River canyon, just above Lake Kaweah. Surrounding terrain is marked by oak woodland forest and foothills. ASL in Three Rivers to 3,000-5,000 ft ASL on the surrounding hills, and upward to 14,000+ ft ASL at Mt. Whitney, fifty miles to the East.

Climate

Demographics

2010
The 2010 United States Census reported that Three Rivers had a population of 2,182. The racial make-up was 1,976 (90.6%) White, 7 (0.3%) African American, 27 (1.2%) Native American, 31 (1.4%) Asian, 1 (0.0%) Pacific Islander, 75 (3.4%) from other races and 65 (3.0%) from two or more races. Hispanic or Latino of any race were 212 people (9.7%).

The Census reported that 2,177 people (99.8% of the population) lived in households, 0 (0%) lived in non-institutionalized group quarters and 5 (0.2%) were institutionalized.

There were 1,018 households, of which 207 (20.3%) had children under the age of 18 living in them, 519 (51.0%) were opposite-sex married couples living together, 65 (6.4%) had a female householder with no husband present, 33 (3.2%) had a male householder with no wife present. There were 35 (3.4%) unmarried opposite-sex partnerships, and 10 (1.0%) same-sex married couples or partnerships. 341 households (33.5%) were made up of individuals, and 159 (15.6%) had someone living alone who was 65 years of age or older. The average household size was 2.14. There were 617 families (60.6% of all households); the average family size was 2.71.

354 people (16.2%) were under the age of 18, 90 people (4.1%) aged 18 to 24, 369 people (16.9%) aged 25 to 44, 837 people (38.4%) aged 45 to 64 and 532 people (24.4%) who were 65 years of age or older. The median age was 52.3 years. For every 100 females, there were 98.2 males. For every 100 females age 18 and over, there were 93.4 males.

The homeowner vacancy rate was 3.1%; the rental vacancy rate was 7.6%. 1,604 people (73.5% of the population) lived in owner-occupied housing units and 573 people (26.3%) lived in rental housing units.

2000
Ats of the 2000 census, there were 2,248 people, 985 households and 659 families residing in the CDP. The racial make-up was 89.86% White, 0.22% African American, 1.29% Native American, 0.67% Asian, 0.13% Pacific Islander, 3.74% from other races and 4.09% from two or more races. Hispanic or Latino of any race were 6.58% of the population.

There were 985 households, of which 24.3% had children under the age of 18 living with them, 54.9% were married couples living together, 7.6% had a female householder with no husband present and 33.0% were non-families. 27.4% of all households were made up of individuals, and 12.2% had someone living alone who was 65 years of age or older. The average household size was 2.28 and the average family size was 2.75.

20.9% of the population were under the age of 18, 4.6% from 18 to 24, 20.3% from 25 to 44, 32.1% from 45 to 64 and 22.1% were 65 years of age or older. The median age was 47 years. For every 100 females, there were 94.1 males. For every 100 females age 18 and over, there were 94.5 males.

The median household income was $42,727 and the median family income was $48,843. Males had a median income of $39,355 and females $31,875. The per capita income was $23,475. About 7.5% of families and 9.8% of the population were below the poverty line, including 14.3% of those under age 18 and 6.4% of those age 65 or over.

History

Kaweah Colony
In 1886, a group of utopian socialists founded an intentional community along the upper North Fork of the Kaweah River. Named Kaweah Colony, it was inspired by the ideas of Laurence Gronlund. When Congress created Sequoia National Park they lost their timber claims and in 1891 were ordered off the land.

Rhodesian pioneers

The Three Rivers cemetery contains the bodies of nine Rhodesian pioneers who lived in Africa ca. 1900 and fought in several wars. The Burnham and Blick families started a  cattle ranch, La Cuesta, in Three Rivers and built homes there. The scenery at Three Rivers is said to be almost identical to that of the Rhodesian kopje country. La Cuesta was sold by John and Judd Blick in 1947 for $90,000.

Mineral King and Walt Disney
In the 1960s and 70s, Walt Disney had plans to develop a ski resort at Mineral King. Ultimately, these plans were withdrawn when Mineral King was annexed into Sequoia National Park in 1978.

Artists' colony

In the 1960s several local artists held exhibitions in the old Apple House on the North Fork Drive. Some of these artists included Adrian Green, Gene Gray, Caroll Barnes, Frank Treuting, Jean Caulfeild and Pauline Whitsun.  Present day artists open their studios every other year for the Three Rivers Artists' Biennial Studio Tour, which was started in 1994 by Elsah Cort (then associated with the Cort Gallery.) More than thirty artists are living and working in Three Rivers, including Mona Fox Selph, James Entz, and Aranga Firstman, who all taught at College of the Sequoias in Visalia, California. Other well-known artists are Martha Widmann, Rick Badgley, Jana Botkin, Nikki Crain, Tina St. John, Nadi Spencer and Martin Pugh.

The Arts Alliance of Three Rivers is the local arts organization, started in 1985, with many local artists and art patrons as members. It sponsors the annual Redbud Arts and Craft Festival every May. It also established the Lorraine Young Scholarship Fund, which awards art scholarships to local Three Rivers graduating high school students. This fund was established by the Arts Alliance in honor of the many years of service Lorraine gave to both the Arts Alliance and to the community of Three Rivers. The Arts Alliance became a 501(c)(3) tax exempt organization in 2010.

Politics

Schools
 Three Rivers Union School District (K-8, average attendance: 157 students)
 Woodlake Union High School (9-12), Three Rivers Students usually go to high school in Woodlake, CA

Three Rivers is the location of the Diocese of Fresno's St. Anthony Retreat Center and Santa Teresita Youth Conference Center, and of Riata Ranch International, a world-renowned Western Performance Arts Training Facility and home of the world famous Riata Ranch Cowboy Girls.

Three Rivers was one site of a handful of U.S. boarding schools run by the Hare Krishna movement. These schools, called "gurukulas", were closed by the mid-1980s. Other locations included Los Angeles, Moundsville in West Virginia and Dallas.

Notable people
Mary Harris - longtime Three Rivers resident and noted musician.
Curt Siodmak (August 10, 1902 – September 2, 2000) was a German-American novelist and screenwriter, who was a longtime resident of Three Rivers with his wife Henrietta (November 14, 1903 - May 10, 2001).
Adin Ross - American streamer, YouTuber, internet personality

References

External links

 The Kaweah Commonwealth: Weekly newspaper and visitor information online
 Three Rivers Village information
 Sequoia Foothills Chamber of Commerce
  Blog about happenings in the Three Rivers area
  Sequoia and Kings Canyon official website
 Three Rivers Historical Museum

Census-designated places in Tulare County, California
Populated places in the Sierra Nevada (United States)
San Joaquin Valley